Ravenscar may refer to:
Ravenscar, North Yorkshire
Ravenscar railway station, in Ravenscar, North Yorkshire
 Ravenscar profile, a subset of the Ada programming language designed for safety-critical real-time computing
Roger Comstock, Marquis of Ravenscar, a character in Neal Stephenson's The Baroque Cycle